Australian Made: The Movie is a July 1987 live concert film of the Australian Made tour from December 1986 to January 1987. The tour featured internationally performing Australian acts, INXS, Divinyls, Models, The Triffids, The Saints, I'm Talking, Mental As Anything and Jimmy Barnes. The film was directed by INXS' video collaborator, Richard Lowenstein but did not contain any footage of Mental As Anything. Concert segments were linked by Troy Davies interviewing audience members and musicians.

Australian Made: The Movie was released in Australia on VHS in 1988. In 1989 in the United Kingdom, an edited VHS version, retitled as Australian Made: Featuring INXS Live, was issued which removed footage by Barnes. An edited DVD version was released in 2003 with all footage of The Triffids and Barnes removed. On 25 November 2016 a remastered version of the original film, with widescreen and remastered audio, was shown in Australian cinemas.

Reception

Professional reviews

Allmovie's Dan Pavlides summarised the film as depicting artists "which reflect the worldwide popularity of Australian rock music that emerged during the 1980s".

Cast
The cast includes:

Scenes
Australian Made: The Movie
 Various artists / INXS – "Intro" / "Melting the Sun" (5:58)
 Jimmy Barnes – "Ride the Night Away" (5:31)
 The Triffids – "Wide Open Road" (5:46)
 I'm Talking – "Lead the Way" (6:25)
 The Saints – "Ghost Ships" (6:00)
 Divinyls – "Only Lonely" (3:47)
 Divinyls – "Temperamental" (3:59)
 Models – "Let's Kiss" (5:44)
 Models – "Out of Mind, Out of Sight" (4:44)
 INXS – "Burn for You" (4:12)
 Jimmy Barnes – "Lessons in Love" (5:44)
 INXS – "What You Need" (6:04)
 INXS – "The Loved One" (5:18)
 Jimmy Barnes – "Working Class Man" (4:01)
 INXS, Jimmy Barnes & a few friends – "Good Times" (4:28)
 INXS – "Good Times" (instrumental) / "End titles" (2:38)

Australian Made: Featuring INXS Live DVD version
 "Intro" – (2:56)
 INXS – "Melting the Sun" (3:26)
 I'm Talking – "Lead the Way" (4:20)
 The Saints – "Ghostships" (3:51)
 Models – "Let's Kiss" (3:31)
 Models – "Out of Mind, Out of Sight" (3:50)
 Divinyls – "Only Lonely" (2:59)
 Divinyls – "Temperamental" (3:55)
 INXS – "Burn for You" (4:00)
 INXS – "Mystify" (3:11)
 INXS – "What You Need" (4:36)
 INXS – "The Loved One" (4:58)
 INXS – "Don't Change" (6:49)

References

External links

1987 films
Australian musical films
Films set in Australia
1980s English-language films
Films directed by Richard Lowenstein